Yadong County, 
also known by its Tibetan name Dromo/Tromo County 
is a frontier county and trade-market of the Tibet region of China, part of its Shigatse Prefecture. 

Yadong County is coextensive with the Chumbi valley that extends south into the Himalayas between Sikkim and Bhutan. It shares boundaries with both India and Bhutan. It covers about 4,306 square kilometers with a population of 10,000.  Its headquarters is Yatung (also called Shasima).

Geography

The Yadong County mainly consists of the Chumbi Valley, called Dromo/Tromo in Tibetan. The valley is bordered by Dongkya Range in the west and Massong-Chungdung range in the east. (See map.) Two rivers Khambu Machu and Tromo Chu arise within the valley and join together at the town of Yatung. The joint river is known in English by its Bhutanese name Amo Chu. (Tibetans continue to call it Khambu Machu.)

The town of Yatung (also called Shasima), is the headquarters of the county. It is close to the borders of both the Indian state of Sikkim and also Bhutan. In 1986, it was reported to have had a hotel, a guest house, some government offices and army barracks. Yadong is connected to the Indian state of Sikkim via the Nathu La pass.

Local specialities include Dromo fish and barley wine while the main tourist sites are Donggar Monastery, Kagyu Monastery and Khangbu Hotspring. 

As part of the China Western Development strategy, the Chinese government planned to extend the Qinghai–Tibet Railway from Lhasa to Yatung.

History
According to the Convention of Calcutta of 1890–94 signed by Great Britain and Qing dynasty China, the market at Old Yatung was opened to India in the valley coming down from the Jelep La pass. At that time there was a wall-like structure across the valley's stream extending part way up each side of the valley thus blocking the road to the interior of the county. This was a demarcation line that the British subjects were forbidden to cross. It was manned by 20 Tibetan soldiers under a sergeant along with three Chinese officials. The construction of the wall was reported to be one of the reasons that led to the British expedition to Tibet in 1904. According to the resulting Convention of Lhasa, a British trade-agent was to be stationed at "Yatung". The British picked the location of the present Yatung town for the trade agency. (Two more trade agencies were also located at Gyantse and Gartok as part of the same Convention).

Administrative divisions
Yadong County administers the following two towns and five townships:
Yatung or Shasima
 Phari
 
 
 
  or "upper Yadong" Township based at Rubingang
 Xiayadong or "lower Yadong" Township based at Rinchengang

See also 

 Duoqing Cuo

References

External links
 Yadong County Annals

Counties of Tibet
Shigatse